Apop may refer to:

APOP (Email Protocol)
APOP Kinyras Peyias FC, a Cypriot football club
Apoptygma Berzerk, a Norwegian electronica band